Pseudamastus is a monotypic moth genus in the family Erebidae described by Hervé de Toulgoët in 1985. The genus contains only one species, Pseudamastus alsa, first described by Herbert Druce in 1890. It is found on Dominica, Guadeloupe and Martinique.

Subspecies
Pseudamastus alsa alsa (Guadeloupe, Dominica)
Pseudamastus alsa lalannei Toulgoët, 1985 (Martinique)

References

External links

Phaegopterina
Monotypic moth genera
Moths described in 1890
Moths of the Caribbean